Here and There is a Canadian documentary television series which aired on CBC Television from 1955 to 1958.

Premise
This series of documentaries concerning Canadian life featured various hosts and producers during its run. Each episode was dedicated to a single topic such as Atlantic ship construction, the Royal Canadian Mint and Canadian air force training. The approach was inspired by the Trans-Canada Network radio show Scene. Most episodes were filmed, with some live studio broadcasts in late 1958.

Scheduling
This half-hour series was broadcast at various times (Eastern) as follows:

References

External links
 

CBC Television original programming
1950s Canadian documentary television series
1955 Canadian television series debuts
1958 Canadian television series endings
Black-and-white Canadian television shows